ATHLYT  is the first student athlete name, image, likeness (NIL) app that matches registered student athletes with companies looking for paid NIL opportunities. Recent changes in NCAA rules now allow student athletes to receive compensation for their NIL, ATHLYT matches brands with their registered student athletes to promote their goods on their social media, events and sporting events. The platform allows companies to recruit multiple student athletes, or whole teams for an advertising campaign in single place.

In 2021, the NCAA put in place a NIL policy which allows student athletes to profit from NIL deals. ATHLYT signed what is believed to be a first of its kind NIL deal with Grambling State University that will provide compensation to all of their student athletes. ATHLYT will parter with Urban Edge Network to provide funding for the program at the HBCU. The deal will allow 300 student athletes to be paid for their image to be shown on Times Square billboard.  

ATHLYT has also signed a deal to bring NIL opportunities to the Gulf Coast Athletic Conference

The company's co-founders are Ray Austin and Brian Jagger. Ray is Commissioner of the Fan Controlled Football league, a former NFL draft pick who played for the NY Jets and the Chicago Bears.  Brian Jagger is the founder of Casting Calls America.

References

College sports culture in the United States
Marketing
Sports marketing
Grambling State Tigers
Gulf Coast Athletic Conference